Karl Heinz Renneberg (29 January 1927 – 21 October 1999) was a West German rower who competed in the 1952 and 1960 Summer Olympics. He was born in Gelsenkirchen. In 1952 he and his partner Heinz Eichholz were eliminated in the first round repêchage of the Coxless pair event. Eight years later was a crew member of the boat starting for the United Team of Germany that won the gold medal in the coxed pair competition.

References

1927 births
1999 deaths
Olympic rowers of Germany
Olympic rowers of the United Team of Germany
Rowers at the 1952 Summer Olympics
Rowers at the 1960 Summer Olympics
Olympic gold medalists for the United Team of Germany
Sportspeople from Gelsenkirchen
Olympic medalists in rowing
West German male rowers
Medalists at the 1960 Summer Olympics
20th-century German people